Louis Hadley Evans Jr. (June 20, 1926 in Wilmington, California – October 29, 2008 in Fresno, California), was a religious leader. He died of amyotrophic lateral sclerosis (Lou Gehrig's Disease) at his home in Fresno, California. Evans was one of four children of Marie Egly and the Rev. Louis Hadley Evans Sr., pastor of First Presbyterian Church of Hollywood.  Louis graduated from Hollywood High School where he was A.S.B. President, before serving in the Navy during WWII.

Evans led the first World Deputation team to go out from Hollywood Presbyterian in June 1950.  The early teams had the goal of taking the “message of Christ’s redeeming love to the war-weary students of Europe.”  However, they were challenged by Corrie ten Boom: "The people of Europe do need to see the love and forgiveness of Christ. But the gospel team idea won’t work. You have not suffered as the people in Europe have suffered, so what right have you to speak?  If you want to make a vital witness to the power of your faith, go to a city destroyed by American bombs. Identify with the people. Work with them. Eat what they eat. Sleep where they sleep. Maybe if you do it well enough and long enough, without compensation, they will hear what you have to say."  The team was sponsored by the World Council of Churches with the task of rebuilding foundations of destroyed buildings in Germany and France. By the 1960s, the group was focused on East Germany and known as the “Berlin Fellowship.” 

Louis and his family moved to Washington to minister at the National Presbyterian Church, where most American presidents have attended services and visitors have included Queen Elizabeth and Mother Teresa.  Ronald Reagan and his wife, Nancy Reagan attended Louis original Bel Air Church in California, as well as the National Presbyterian Church during his time as President.

Louis Jr. was the organizing pastor of Bel Air Church in Bel Air, California, where the first church gatherings were at the manse (pastor's home) in April 1956.

Louis Evans Jr.'s ministry was influenced by Henrietta Mears who was the Christian Education Director of 1st Presbyterian Hollywood where Louis's father was pastor. Mears led several of Louis Evans Jr.'s friends to evangelism and ministry including Bill Bright, and Richard Halvorsen.

Louis wife, Colleen Townsend Evans and a few other Hollywood starlets started the Hollywood Christian Group in 1949 in Mears's home.  Original Hollywood Christian Group participants included Roy Rogers, Dale Evans, Billy Graham, Colleen Townsend Evans, Jane Russell, Stuart Hamblen, Ronald Reagan and many others, in the living room of Henrietta Mears home,  The group was chaplained by J. Edwin Orr from 1949-1951.  This group, the Hollywood Christian Group is where Billy Graham met  radio personality, Stuart Hamblen and other members of the Hollywood Christian Group including the Evanses, who visited Graham on location at the Los Angeles crusade.  Up until this point, Graham was doing regional crusades successfully, but his numbers were not reaching the masses until Stuart Hamblen reported about Graham's crusades. Once this happened, Graham's crusades exploded in numbers and became national news.

References

American religious leaders
1926 births
2008 deaths